Kai Kodutha Deivam is a 1964 Indian Tamil-language romantic drama film directed by K. S. Gopalakrishnan. The film stars Sivaji Ganesan, Savitri, S. S. Rajendran and K. R. Vijaya. It was released on 18 July 1964 and became a success, winning the National Film Award for Best Feature Film in Tamil – President's silver medal. The film was remade Telugu as Marapurani Katha (1967), in Malayalam as Palunku Pathram (1970) and in Hindi as Pyar Ki Kahani (1971).

Plot 

The film relates the true meaning of friendship between two youths, Raghu and Ravi. Ravi leaves his home town in Tamil Nadu and comes to Amritsar. Here, Raghu finds him in an unconscious state and takes him home. Raghu sacrifices his managerial post and gives it to Ravi. Ravi, however, does not reveal his true identity and the real reason for leaving home. As per his parents wish, Ragu sees a girl to marry. However, when Ravi sees the photograph of the girl, he asks Raghu not to marry her. A shocking truth about the girl is then revealed to Raghu.

Cast 
Sivaji Ganesan as Raghu
Savithri as Kokila
S. S. Rajendran as Ravi
K. R. Vijaya as Latha
M. R. Radha as Keady Varathan
S. V. Ranga Rao as Mahadevan
V. Nagayya as Latha's father
Pushpalatha as Sakunthala
S. V. Sahasranamam as Mahadevan's lawyer
R. Balasubramaniyam as Raghu's father
Pushpavalli as Raghu's mother
Karikol Raju (guest role)
Radha Bai (guest role)
C.I.D.Sakunthala as a dancer

Production 
Kai Kodutha Deivam was Vijaya's second film as an actress. Ganesan helped her with dialogue delivery, at a time when dialogues were not dubbed but recorded on set.

Soundtrack 
The soundtrack was composed by Viswanathan–Ramamoorthy, while the lyrics were written by Bharathiyar and Kannadasan. The songs "Aayirathil Oruthi" and "Sindhu Nadhiyin" were well received. The Telugu portions of the song "Sindhunadhi" were performed by Telugu composer J. V. Raghavulu.

Release and reception 
Kai Kodutha Deivam was released on 18 July 1964. The Indian Express wrote, "[W]ith fine visual conception of story-weaving, [Gopalakrishnan] has made the film slick and enjoyable." T. M. Ramachandran wrote in Sport and Pastime, "The story has been told on the screen in a logical manner and with a fast tempo. The director has shown great imagination and understanding in preparing a well-knit screenplay". Kanthan of Kalki said the story was a "difficult subject", but appreciated the fact that all actors were given a chance to shine. The film ran successfully for 100 days in theatres in Tamil Nadu, and won the National Film Award for Best Feature Film in Tamil – President's silver medal in 1965.

References

Bibliography

External links 
 

1964 romantic drama films
1960s Tamil-language films
1964 films
Best Tamil Feature Film National Film Award winners
Films directed by K. S. Gopalakrishnan
Films scored by Viswanathan–Ramamoorthy
Films with screenplays by K. S. Gopalakrishnan
Indian romantic drama films
Tamil films remade in other languages